Jowriz (also Romanized as Jowrīz; also known as Chow Rīz and Chowrīz) is a village in Golshan Rural District, in the Central District of Tabas County, South Khorasan Province, Iran. At the 2006 census, its population was 29, in 7 families.

References 

Populated places in Tabas County